Imaginary Roads is an album by the new-age guitarist William Ackerman, released in 1988.

Critical reception
The Kingston Whig-Standard wrote that the album "consists mainly of [Ackerman] simply strumming his acoustic guitar ever-so-slowly ... five years ago this stuff sounded revolutionary and filled a need for baby-boomers who couldn't relate to the current musical marketplace."

Track listing
"The Moment in Which You Must Finally Let Go of the Tether Which Has Held Your Hope Airborne" – 5:42
"A Region of Clouds" – 4:42
"If You Look" – 5:39
"Floyd's Ghost" – 6:18
"Wondering Again What's Behind the Eyes" – 5:50
"Dawn Treader" – 4:21
"The Prospect of Darrow's Barn and the Blossoms of an Apple Spring on Imaginary Road" – 3:03
"Brother A Teaches 7" – 2:57
"Innocent Moon" – 3:37
"The Moment – Reprise" – 0:37
"If You Look - Version II" - 5:30 [*]
"Darrow's Barn - Version II" - 3:05 [*]

Production 
 Recorded at Studio D, Sausalito, California, and Different Fur Recording, San Francisco, California.

Other contributors
 Allaudin Mathieu – piano on "The Moment in Which You Must Finally Let Go of the Tether Which Has Held Your Hope Airborne"
 Chuck Greenberg – Lyricon, Yamaha WX-7 wind synthesizer and Yamaha DX7 keyboard synthesizer on "If You Look"
 Michael Manring – fretless bass guitar on "If You Look" and "Brother A Teaches 7"
 Philip Aaberg – piano on "Floyd's Ghost"
 Kifu Mitsuhashi – shakuhachi flute on "Wondering Again What's Behind the Eyes"
 Jill Haley – oboe on "The Prospect of Darrow's Barn and the Blossoms of an Apple Spring on Imaginary Road"
 Charles Bisharat – violin on "Brother A Teaches 7"

Reissue
The album was reissued in 2009 by Valley Entertainment.

References 

Windham Hill Records albums
1988 albums
William Ackerman albums
Albums produced by William Ackerman